Swiftsure was a galleon of the English Navy, launched in 1573. She was rebuilt in 1592.

In 1607 she was renamed Speedwell, when she was rebuilt for a second time at Deptford, now classed as a middling ship. She was wrecked near Vlissingen on 1 November 1624.

Notes

References
Citations

Bibliography

Lavery, Brian (2003) The Ship of the Line - Volume 1: The development of the battlefleet 1650-1850. Conway Maritime Press. .
Winfield, Rif (2009) British Warships in the Age of Sail 1603-1714: Design, Construction, Careers and Fates. Seaforth Publishing. .

Ships of the English navy
16th-century ships
English ship Swiftsure (1573)
English ship Swiftsure (1573)